Friday Samu (born 9 May 1995) is a Zambian professional football player who plays as a forward for the club Maritzburg United.

References

1995 births
Living people
Zambian footballers
Zambia international footballers
Association football goalkeepers
Zambia A' international footballers
Green Buffaloes F.C. players
2018 African Nations Championship players
2020 African Nations Championship players
Zambian expatriate footballers
Expatriate soccer players in South Africa
Zambian expatriate sportspeople in South Africa